Dežerice is a village and municipality in Bánovce nad Bebravou District in the Trenčín Region of north-western Slovakia.

History
In historical records the village was first mentioned in 1208.

Geography
It has a population of about 610 people.

Genealogical resources

The records for genealogical research are available at the state archive "Statny Archiv in Nitra, Slovakia"

 Roman Catholic church records (births/marriages/deaths): 1713-1895 (parish A)
 Lutheran church records (births/marriages/deaths): 1732-1935 (parish B)

See also
 List of municipalities and towns in Slovakia

References

External links

  Official page
Demographic information at the Statistical Office of the Slovak Republic
Surnames of living people in Dezerice

Villages and municipalities in Bánovce nad Bebravou District